"Japanese Girl" is a 2005 song by Hitomi.

Japanese Girl may also refer to:

 The Japanese Girl, a 1971 collection of short stories by Winston Graham
 Japanese Girl, a 1976 album by Akiko Yano
 "Japanese Girl", a 1963 single by Lloyd Clarke
 "Japanese Girl", a 1985 single by Max-Him
 "Japanese Girl", a 1989 single by Akiko Ikuina